Taunsa is a Tehsil (subdivision) of Taunsa District, Punjab, Pakistan. Its capital is Taunsa city.

Administration
Taunsa tehsil is administratively subdivided into 18 Union Councils, these are:

References

Taunsa District
Tehsils of Punjab, Pakistan